The Na'im (singular Al Nuaimi ) is an Arab tribe in the United Arab Emirates. The tribe is also present in other gulf countries.

The Na'im is divided into three sections, the Al Bu Kharaiban, the Khawatir and the Al Bu Shamis (singular Al Shamsi). It is from the former section that the current Rulers of the Emirate of Ajman are drawn. Of the three sections, the Al Bu Shamis has become virtually independent and associated closely with the Al Bu Falasa of Dubai.

The traditional heart of Na'im territory was the oasis town of Buraimi and nearby Al Ain, where Na'im expansion came at the expense of the Dhawahir tribe, but also rubbed up against the Bani Yas and the allied Manasir. Although the Na'im were linked to the growing Wahhabi influence in the Buraimi area and adopted the doctrine, they allied with other forces to evict the Wahhabis from Buraimi and subsequently occupied many of the forts around Buraimi.

Origins 
In 1818, according to the 'British Assistant Political Agent in Turkish Arabia', Captain Robert Taylor, the Na'im numbered some 20,000 men in Buraimi and 400 in Ajman.

By the beginning of the 19th century, the Na'im were spread across much of the area of the modern-day UAE, with families settled in Ajman, Dhaid, Hamriyah, Sharjah, Hafit, Heerah and Ras Al Khaimah. Some 5,500 Na'im at the time lived in and around the Buraimi oasis. A further 660 houses of Na'im were located at Dhank, in Dhahirah, Oman. At the time, the Na'im were mostly settled in towns or in pastoral communities, although the Khawatir were Bedouins, roaming a dar consisting of the Jiri plain and the Hafit area with 800 camels, 1,500 sheep and goats and some 100 cattle.

Masfout 

Masfout, a mountainous village in the Wadi Hatta, had long been home to the Na'im. They found themselves under threat in 1905 when the Bani Qitab built a fort in the wadi and started to harass caravans passing through the pass to the Omani Batina coast. Appealing to Zayed bin Khalifa Al Nahyah of Abu Dhabi, and following a meeting of the Trucial Sheikhs in Dubai in April of that year, they gained Zayed's support (against the Sheikh of Umm Al Qawain, who supported the Bani Qitab) and retained Masfout.  The Na'imi of Masfout were in almost constant conflict with the people of Hajarain, which later became a dependency of Dubai known as Hatta. However, they considered themselves independent of the Rulers of Ajman.

In 1948, Masfout was seized from its Na'imi Sheikh, Saqr bin Sultan Al Hamouda, by Sheikh Rashid bin Humaid Al Nuaimi III of Ajman, when Hamouda was unable to raise a force of men to oppose Rashid. Masfout has been part of the Emirate of Ajman since, albeit an exclave.

A period of uncertainty followed as the various Sheikhs of the region attempted to jostle for influence in order to sign petroleum concessions, with the Sultan in Muscat and the Saudis paying tribute to the Na'im in Buraimi and other local tribes in the area in return for fealty which often turned out to be short-lived. This activity among the rulers and tribes eventually led to the Buraimi Dispute.

At the turn of the nineteenth century, the Na'im were arguably the dominant force in the area West of the Hajar Mountains, with some 13,000 members and the ability to raise at least 2,000 fighting men. By the 1940s, this had dropped to just 300–400 rifles and the tribe was split into factions.

Competition for grazing and other resources often spilled over into conflict between the tribes and the Na'im were often involved in disputes and open warfare with other tribes, including the Bani Ka'ab, Bani Qitab and Al Bu Falah. However, the Al Bu Shamis remained generally on good terms with other tribes, particularly the Duru and Bani Qitab. With the continuing decline of the Na'im tribal federation, the Al Bu Shamis maintained an almost completely separate identity and, in fact, the Al Bu Shamis leader of Al Heera – Sheikh Abdulrahman bin Muhammad Al Shamsi was often at loggerheads, if not war, with the Ruler of Ajman.

Bahrain 
The Na'im was one of the several bedouin tribes to move to Bahrain in 1783 after the Al Khalifa conquered the island.

Qatar 
The tribe were reported as being one of the most powerful tribes in Qatar in an 1890 report by the British government. In J.G. Lorimer's Gazetteer of the Persian Gulf published in 1904, he described the Na'im as "a Bedouin tribe who grazed their cattle on pastures surrounding Zubarah in 1873." He stated that 60 or 70 of the tribe's branch in Qatar had a hereditary attachment to the Bahraini emir.

References 

Tribes of the United Arab Emirates
History of the United Arab Emirates